Mũ Đinh Tự (chữ Nôm: 帽丁字) also known as mũ chữ đinh, mũ Nhục. It is a type of hat with the shape of the letter Đinh (丁) was a type of hat worn in Vietnam throughout the Lê dynasty and fell out of favor in the 19th century. It used to be widely worn by gentlemen and military officers. Nowadays it can still be seen at local festivals.

Images

Vietnamese culture
Vietnamese headgear